WA3 may refer to:
 Washington's 3rd congressional district
 Washington State Route 3
 Wild Arms 3, a role-playing video game
 WA3, a postcode district in Warrington, England; see WA postcode area